Meade County is a county in the U.S. state of South Dakota. As of the 2020 United States Census, the population was 29,852. Its county seat is Sturgis. The county was created in 1889 and named for Fort Meade, which was garrisoned as a United States military post in the area in 1878 and itself named for General George Meade.

Meade County is part of the Rapid City Metropolitan Statistical Area.

Geography
The upper part of Meade County is drained by Cherry Creek. The Cheyenne River flows northeastward along the southeast boundary of the county. The county terrain has mountain ridges in the west and southwest areas, with the remainder consisting of semi-arid rolling hills, partly dedicated to agriculture. The county terrain slopes to the east and northeast; its highest point Flagstaff Mountain is near the southwest corner, at 5,421' (1566m) ASL.

It is South Dakota's largest county by area.

Major highways

  Interstate 90
  U.S. Highway 14
 U.S. Highway 14A
  U.S. Highway 212
  South Dakota Highway 34
  South Dakota Highway 73
  South Dakota Highway 79

Adjacent counties

 Perkins County - north
 Ziebach County - east
 Haakon County -southeast
 Pennington County - south
 Lawrence County - southwest
 Butte County - northwest

Protected areas

 Bear Butte Lake State Lakeside Use Area
 Bear Butte National Wildlife Refuge
 Bear Butte State Park
 Black Hills National Cemetery
 Black Hills National Forest (partial)
 Curlew Lake State Game Production Area
 Marcotte State Game Production Area
 Tisdale Lake State Game Production Area
 Opal Lake State Game Production Area

Lakes
 Bear Butte Lake
 Curlew Lake
 Durkee Lake
 Opal Lake
 Tisdale Dam

Demographics

2000 census
As of the 2000 United States Census, there were 24,253 people, 8,805 households, and 6,700 families in the county. The population density was 7 people per square mile (3/km2). There were 10,149 housing units at an average density of 3 per square mile (1/km2). The racial makeup of the county was 92.65% White, 1.48% Black or African American, 2.04% Native American, 0.63% Asian, 0.07% Pacific Islander, 0.61% from other races, and 2.52% from two or more races. 2.10% of the population were Hispanic or Latino of any race.

There were 8,805 households, out of which 39.90% had children under the age of 18 living with them, 64.40% were married couples living together, 8.30% had a female householder with no husband present, and 23.90% were non-families. 19.90% of all households were made up of individuals, and 7.50% had someone living alone who was 65 years of age or older. The average household size was 2.66 and the average family size was 3.05.

The county population contained 28.40% under the age of 18, 10.60% from 18 to 24, 29.60% from 25 to 44, 21.00% from 45 to 64, and 10.40% who were 65 years of age or older. The median age was 33 years. For every 100 females, there were 102.20 males. For every 100 females age 18 and over, there were 101.60 males.

The median income for a household in the county was $36,992, and the median income for a family was $40,537. Males had a median income of $26,572 versus $20,517 for females. The per capita income for the county was $17,680. About 7.90% of families and 9.40% of the population were below the poverty line, including 11.80% of those under age 18 and 6.10% of those age 65 or over.

2010 census
As of the 2010 United States Census, there were 25,434 people, 9,903 households, and 7,067 families in the county. The racial makeup of the county was 92.0% white, 2.3% American Indian, 1.3% black or African American, 0.6% Asian, 0.1% Pacific islander, 0.8% from other races, and 2.9% from two or more races. Those of Hispanic or Latino origin made up 3.0% of the population. In terms of ancestry, 40.5% were German, 15.3% were Irish, 13.2% were Norwegian, 11.3% were English, and 6.9% were American.

Of the 9,903 households, 33.9% had children under the age of 18 living with them, 58.2% were married couples living together, 8.8% had a female householder with no husband present, 28.6% were non-families, and 23.6% of all households were made up of individuals. The average household size was 2.49 and the average family size was 2.93. The median age was 35.9 years.

The median income for a household in the county was $46,180 and the median income for a family was $54,200. Males had a median income of $34,113 versus $27,548 for females. The per capita income for the county was $22,045. About 6.6% of families and 10.1% of the population were below the poverty line, including 12.1% of those under age 18 and 10.1% of those age 65 or over.

Communities

Cities

 Box Elder (part)
 Faith
 Piedmont
 Sturgis (county seat)
 Summerset

Census-designated places
 Blackhawk
 Blucksberg Mountain
 Ellsworth AFB (former)
 Wonderland Homes

Unincorporated communities

 Bend 
 Boneita Springs
 Cedar Canyon
 Dalzell
 Elm Springs
 Enning
 Fairpoint
 Fox Ridge
 Haydraw
 Hereford
 Howes
 Marcus
 Maurine
 Mud Butte
 Opal
 Plainview
 Redowl
 Stoneville
 Tilford
 Union Center
 Viewfield
 White Owl
 Postville

Townships

 Dakota
 Eagle
 Elm Springs
 Howard
 Lakeside
 Smithville
 Upper Red Owl

Unorganized territories
 Belle Fourche-Cheyenne Valleys
 North Meade
 Southwest Meade

Politics
Like most of the Black Hills, Meade County is heavily Republican.  It last supported a Democrat for president in 1964. As a measure of how Republican the county is, Franklin Roosevelt carried it in 1936 with only a plurality during his 46-state landslide, and Lyndon Johnson only won it by 183 votes in 1964.

See also
 National Register of Historic Places listings in Meade County, South Dakota

References

External links
 Meade County government website
 Meade County Times-Tribune - local newspaper

 
1889 establishments in Dakota Territory
Populated places established in 1889
Rapid City, South Dakota metropolitan area
Black Hills